Common Sense: A Political History is a book-length political history of "common sense" by Sophia Rosenfeld. It was published by Harvard University Press in 2011.

Further reading

External links 
 

2011 non-fiction books
English-language books
Harvard University Press books
Books about politics of the United States